Neptunidraco (meaning "Neptune's dragon") is an extinct genus of carnivorous marine crocodyliform which lived during the middle Jurassic period (late Bajocian to earliest Bathonian stage) in what is now northeastern Italy. It is known from a partial skeleton (incomplete skull with mandible) recovered from the nodular limestone of the Rosso Ammonitico Veronese Formation. This specimen had been provisionally referred to an unnamed species of Late Jurassic Metriorhynchus or Geosaurus. Neptunidraco was named by Andrea Cau and Federico Fanti in 2011 and the type species is Neptunidraco ammoniticus. The "Portomaggiore crocodile" is the most complete specimen of an Italian metriorhynchid to date and the oldest known metriorhynchid.

Neptunidraco would have measured  in total body length based on the specimen MPUP 6552, originally referred to as "Steneosaurus barettoni" and now reassigned to this genus since the 2013 study.

References

Middle Jurassic crocodylomorphs
Prehistoric pseudosuchian genera
Prehistoric marine crocodylomorphs
Fossil taxa described in 2011
Extinct animals of Europe